The Arakan River is a river located in the municipality of Arakan in Cotabato province in the Philippines. It is one of the tributaries of the Pulangi River.

References

Rivers of the Philippines
Landforms of Cotabato